Rancho San Diego is a census-designated place (CDP) in San Diego County, California. The population was 21,208 at the 2010 census, up from 20,155 at the 2000 census. The area was developed as subdivisions beginning in the 1970s.

Geography
Rancho San Diego is located at  (32.765985, -116.921477). 
The chance of earthquake damage in Rancho San Diego is much lower than California average and is much higher than the national average. The risk of tornado damage in Rancho San Diego is about the same as California average and is much lower than the national average.
The average temperature of Rancho San Diego is 64.73 °F.

Climate
According to the Köppen Climate Classification system, Rancho San Diego has a warm-summer Mediterranean climate, abbreviated "Csa" on climate maps.

Demographics
The residents of Rancho San Diego are upper-middle income, making it an above average income neighborhood. Rancho San Diego has a higher income than 64.4% of the neighborhoods in America. 28.7% of its working population is employed in executive, management, and professional occupations.  The most common language spoken in Rancho San Diego is English, spoken by 72.2% of households. Other important languages spoken here include Arabic, Aramaic, and Spanish.

2010

The census reported that 21,164 people (99.8% of the population) lived in households, 44 (0.2%) lived in non-institutionalized group quarters, and no one was institutionalized.

There were 7,830 households, 2,659 (34.0%) had children under the age of 18 living in them, 4,605 (58.8%) were opposite-sex married couples living together, 834 (10.7%) had a female householder with no husband present, 330 (4.2%) had a male householder with no wife present. There were 311 (4.0%) unmarried opposite-sex partnerships, and 62 (0.8%) same-sex married couples or partnerships. 1,653 households (21.1%) were one person and 713 (9.1%) had someone living alone who was 65 or older. The average household size was 2.70.  There were 5,769 families (73.7% of households); the average family size was 3.16.

The age distribution was 4,681 people (22.1%) under the age of 18, 2,124 people (10.0%) aged 18 to 24, 4,867 people (22.9%) aged 25 to 44, 6,688 people (31.5%) aged 45 to 64, and 2,848 people (13.4%) who were 65 or older. The median age was 41.2 years. For every 100 females, there were 94.1 males. For every 100 females age 18 and over, there were 91.3 males.

There were 8,152 housing units at an average density of 936.9 per square mile, of the occupied units 5,580 (71.3%) were owner-occupied and 2,250 (28.7%) were rented. The homeowner vacancy rate was 0.8%; the rental vacancy rate was 6.5%. 15,530 people (73.2% of the population) lived in owner-occupied housing units and 5,634 people (26.6%) lived in rental housing units.

Estimated median household income in 2011: $83,458 (it was $68,185 in 2000).
Mean prices in 2011: All housing units: $620,385; Detached houses: $699,869; Townhouses or other attached units: $348,104; In 2-unit structures: $299,548; In 3-to-4-unit structures: $275,297; In 5-or-more-unit structures: $277,349; Mobile homes: $93,180
Median household income for houses/condos with a mortgage: $107,787
Median household income for apartments without a mortgage: $69,528
Median gross rent in 2011: $1,614.

2000
At the 2000 census there were 20,155 people, 7,083 households, and 5,588 families in the CDP. The population density was 2,271.7 inhabitants per square mile (877.3/km). The racial makeup of the CDP was 66.7% White, 3.3% African American, 0.6% Native American, 4.2% Asian, 0.3% Pacific Islander, 14.3% from other races, and 4.83% from two or more races. Hispanic or Latino of any race were 10.8%.

Of the 7,083 households 40.8% had children under the age of 18 living with them, 64.9% were married couples living together, 10.4% had a female householder with no husband present, and 21.1% were non-families. 15.8% of households were one person and 3.8% were one person aged 65 or older. The average household size was 2.84 and the average family size was 3.19.

The age distribution was 27.3% under the age of 18, 8.7% from 18 to 24, 29.3% from 25 to 44, 26.4% from 45 to 64, and 8.3% 65 or older. The median age was 37 years. For every 100 females, there were 95.9 males. For every 100 females age 18 and over, there were 92.8 males.

The median household income was $68,185 and the median family income  was $75,919 (these figures had risen to $91,821 and $101,426 respectively as of a 2007 estimate). Males had a median income of $48,995 versus $36,093 for females. The per capita income for the CDP was $29,834. About 3.6% of families and 4.6% of the population were below the poverty line, including 5.5% of those under age 18 and 5.1% of those age 65 or over.

Government

County Service Area No. 26 (Rancho San Diego) provides landscape and open-space maintenance.

Schools
Rancho San Diego is served by the Cajon Valley Union School District and the Grossmont Union High School District.

Steele Canyon High School and Valhalla High School are the primary schools in this location. Rancho San Diego is also home to Cuyamaca College.

References

Census-designated places in San Diego County, California
East County (San Diego County)
Census-designated places in California